Seaspray is series of a British airborne maritime radar systems, initially developed by Ferranti for the Lynx helicopter, built in Edinburgh. It is used primarily as an Air-to-Surface Vessel radar in the anti-submarine and anti missile boat roles. The combination of Lynx and Seaspray has been an export success and operates in numerous armed forces around the world, often along with the related Sea Skua short-range missile.

A new series, Seaspray 7000, was launched in 2002. This is an all-new design sharing only the name with the original design.

History

Original Seaspray
In 1967, Egyptian missile boats sank the Israeli destroyer Eilat, immediately revealing the serious threat these new weapons presented. Considering the problem, it appeared that there was no simple ship-mounted solution. Although the Seacat missile had been designed with a secondary anti-shipping role, it lacked the range needed to attack the stand-off missiles on the boats. Sea Dart could also be used in this role and had much longer range, but was too large to fit on the frigates and smaller ships which made up much of the fleet.

The solution was to move the weapon off of the ships and mount them on helicopters instead. This would mean the missile itself needed only enough range to keep the helicopter out of range of the guns on the boats, which were typically short-range systems with perhaps  effective range. Longer range would be useful as it would hide the approach of the helicopter.

Because the missile boats are small, they can hide under the radar horizon of the ships while closing the range. Detecting these targets before they moved into the range of their anti-ship missiles would require the helicopters to carry an Air-to-Surface Vessel radar and patrol the area around their ships out to the approximate  range of its primary target, the P-15 Termit missile, or Styx as it was known in the west.

The contract for the radar system was given to Ferranti in July 1969. Development was overseen by Sir Donald McCallum. Adrian Hope, 4th Marquess of Linlithgow worked on the system. The design traces many of its design features to the pioneering AIRPASS radar developed for the English Electric Lightning, the first production all-digital radar. The first models were produced as ARI.5979 Mk. 1 version in 1971. Trials of the Seaspray radar system began in 1974.

Seaspray is a monopulse radar that produces 90 kW in the I band (formerly known as the X-band). To make the system as light as possible, the semi-parabolic reflector was made of lightweight foam, faced with a wire mesh. The system scanned 180° in azimuth by rotating the reflector and feed horn together, and scanned vertically by moving the feed horn in relation to the reflector.

Doppler Seaspray
In the late 1980s, improved versions adding doppler radar techniques were developed. These were introduced in the early 1990s as the Seaspray 2000 and 3000, and found use on a variety of aircraft, including the Lynx, Lockheed C-130 Hercules, Westland Sea King, Bell 212 and Fokker F27.

AESA Seaspray 
A completely redesigned Seaspray 7000E version was launched in July 2002 by BAE System Avionics. This replaced the mechanically scanned feed horn with an active electronically scanned array that provided the elevation scanning and fine pointing of the azimuth using beam steering.

Two larger versions were also built using the same electronics. Seaspray 5000E equips the Sikorsky S-92, Embraer EMB-111 patrol conversions, and Canadair CL-604 Challenger. The even larger Seaspray 7500E is used on US Coast Guard C-130's.

The division of Ferranti that developed Seaspray became GEC-Marconi, then BAE Systems, then Selex ES, and is today part of Leonardo.
Seaspray 7500E V2 is an enhancement of the operationally proven 7500E

Operations
The Royal Danish Navy bought the system in the late 1970s. 709 Naval Air Squadron were the first to have Seaspray-equipped Lynx helicopters in 1978. 24 Royal Navy Lynx HAS.2s were sent to the Falklands War, and 16 of these were equipped with Seaspray. In 1992, the Seaspray 2000 was sold to the Scottish Fisheries Protection Agency for £0.5m. In January 1999, the German Navy (Deutsche Marine) bought the system for £15m for its Lynx helicopters. In August 2005, the United States Coast Guard bought the Seaspray 7500E radar system for £69m for its 22 HC-130 Hercules aircraft.

See also
 Searchwater (radar), made by MEL Equipment in Crawley (now Thales UK)
 Sea Searcher radar
 Omera-Segid ORB 31-W

References

External links
 Helicopter Museum

1970s in Edinburgh
1971 establishments in the United Kingdom
1971 in aviation
1971 in military history
Helicopter radars
I band (NATO) radar
Ferranti
Military radars of the United Kingdom
Science and technology in Edinburgh
Military equipment introduced in the 1970s